Araceli Vitta Arambarri (born 4 March 1973) is a Chilean actress and public relations agent.

Biography
Vitta made his television debut as part of the Children's Clan of Sábado Gigante, program directed by Don Francisco for Canal 13. In 1987, she was part of the cast of the television series «La Invitación» from the same channel. Later, she appeared in fictions such as «Fácil de Amar», «Champaña», «Juegos de Fuego» and «A todo dar». In 1998 she decided to move away from the television to focus on her family life.

In 1996, she was part of the international jury of the 37th edition of the Vina del Mar Song Festival.

She was married for 12 years with Daniel Guerrero, Chilean composer and former member of the musical duo «La Sociedad». With him she had a son. They both composed a song called «El juego del amor» (The Game of Love), which was interpreted by Daniela Aleuy and represented to Chile in the international competition of the 2001 Viña del Mar Festival.

Away from television, in 2003, Vitta finished her BA in Public Relations at the Santo Tomás University. She has practiced her profession in different companies and entities such as the Municipality of Pirque. Similarly, she has been part of some plays and has had sporadic appearances in the Chilean version of the series Lo que callamos las mujeres, broadcast by Chilevisión.

Filmography

Novels

Series

Other participations

References

External Links
 

1973 births
Chilean actresses
Santo Tomás University alumni
Living people
Chilean television personalities